Trường Giang may refer to several places in Vietnam, including:

Trường Giang, Bắc Giang, a rural commune of Lục Nam District
, a rural commune of Nông Cống District

It may also refer to

, Vietnamese actor and television presenter

See also
Yangtze (Vietnamese: Sông Dương Tử, Trường Giang)